Prisoners of Power, also known as Inhabited Island, is a science fiction novel written by Soviet authors Arkady and Boris Strugatsky. It was written in 1969 and originally published in the same year in the literary magazine Neva (1969, No. 3, 4, and 5, publication of the Leningrad Division of the Union of Soviet Writers). It appeared in a book form in 1971, with great number of changes as demanded by the state censor; the English translation was released in 1977. The protagonist is a youngster, Maxim Kammerer, who comes from the version of Earth that exists in the Noon Universe and gets stranded on an unknown planet named Saraksh.

Plot summary 

Maxim Kammerer is a young amateur space explorer from Earth, regarded as a failure by his friends and relatives because this occupation is not considered to be a serious pursuit. The novel starts when he accidentally discovers an unexplored planet Saraksh inhabited by a humanoid race. The atmospheric conditions on Saraksh are such that the inhabitants believe that they live inside a sphere. The level of technological development on the planet is similar to mid-20th century Earth. The planet recently came through big nuclear and conventional war and the predicament of the population is dire. When Maxim lands, the natives mistake his small spaceship for a weapon and destroy it.

At first he doesn't take his situation seriously, imagining himself a Robinson Crusoe stranded on an island inhabited by primitive but friendly natives. He is looking forward to establishing contact and befriending the population of the planet. However, the reality turns out to be far from glamorous. After being captured by armed natives and initially taken to what appears to be a concentration camp, Kammerer is sent to some governmental research institute which treats him as a mental patient. He escapes and finds himself in the capital of a totalitarian state, perpetually at war with its neighbors. The city is grim and polluted, with police and military omnipresent.

He makes friends among the ordinary people that lead the life of privation and misery, while twice daily everyone is overcome by sudden an unexplained bouts of ecstatic enthusiasm, proclaiming their total allegiance and undying gratitude to the country's hidden rulers, known as the Unknown Fathers (in the censored versions Fire-bearing Creators), who are said to have the best interests of the people at heart, serving as bulwark against threats foreign and domestic, mainly from the so-called degens (degenerates), the uncompromising enemies of the people, the terrorists who sometimes blow up the anti-ballistic missile (ABM) towers strewn around the country.

All this makes little sense to Maxim, since his own society is free from war, hostility, crime and material shortages. Still confused about the official ideology, Kammerer gets enlisted in the military, to serve and protect the state and its people. He is ordered to execute some captured degens, one of them a woman. When he refuses, he is shot multiple times, survives, and joins the underground which consists of the degens who suffer great headaches twice daily. Degens believe that the ABM towers are responsible for that.

Maxim participates in an attack on one such tower.  Captured, tried and sent to a concentration camp in the South, the same one where he has made his landing, he is finally revealed the truth about the towers by a fellow prisoner high-ranking member of the underground. They turn out to be broadcasting a mind control signal, employed by the Fathers to control the population.

The constant low-intensity broadcast suppresses the ability of most people to evaluate information critically, making the omnipresent regime propaganda much more effective.  In addition, twice a day an intense signal relieves mental stresses caused by the disconnect between the propaganda and the observed reality by inducing euphoria in the susceptible majority, and intense headaches in others who are immune to the signal's coercive power. Those are the only sober-thinking people in the country, including both the underground degens and the Fathers themselves.

Astonished and appalled by this revelation, Kammerer makes it his mission to rid the planet of the mind control broadcast system. Several of his schemes fail because the cure may be worse than the disease. He escapes to the radioactive South in hopes of organizing an invasion, but the mutants dwelling there are weakly and softhearted, and the tribes further South are ruthless barbarians.  He then turns to the state's neighbor — the Island Empire — but abandons this plan after finding documents on a destroyed Empire submarine that describe mass killings and other atrocities that the Empire military routinely perpetrates.

He now focuses on trying to find and destroy the Control Center where the mind control broadcasts originate. Meanwhile, the Fathers decide to start a small victorious war on the country's northern neighbor, Honti. Kammerer surrenders to local gendarmes and is assigned to a penal battalion that is supposed to lead the invasion of the North. In this abortive action, most of his friends perish while Kammerer himself barely escapes annihilation in retaliatory nuclear blasts. Having served in the war, he earns himself a rehabilitation from the state and is installed in a secret research institution at the behest of a powerful Father known as the Wanderer, who remains out of reach.

A Father known as the Smarty realizes that Kammerer is not affected by the broadcasts in any way and plots to use him to stage a coup and take over the state. His plan is for Kammerer to capture the Control Center and use its transmissions to incapacitate his rivals and install him as the new ruler in the minds of the population. The center is protected by intense depression-inducing local broadcast field that makes it impossible for any native to penetrate it. The Smarty reveals the center's location to Kammerer, who plays along; however, after penetrating the center, he destroys it instead, thus disabling the whole system countrywide.

It is revealed that the powerful Father, the Wanderer, is in fact a human progressor named  Rudolf Sikorski, carefully working in secret to gradually improve the lot of the people of Saraksh. His plans now ruined, the Wanderer finally catches up with Maxim and lambasts him for his interference. He describes the unanticipated consequences of Kammerer's rash actions: up to 20% of the people may die or go insane due to the withdrawal from the mind control signal; Saraksh faces famine, anarchy, widespread radioactive pollution, and looming invasion by the Island Empire which they planned to stop using the depression field. The Wanderer orders Kammerer to leave the planet but Maxim refuses and stays on, to help stabilize the situation. Despite the many upheavals that Saraksh has ahead of her, he is still glad he destroyed the Control Center because now the people can be in charge of their own destiny.

Sequels 
According to Boris Strugatsky's later reminiscences, the Strugatsky brothers were planning to write a sequel to Inhabited Island. However, following the death of Arkady Strugatsky, the surviving brother felt that he could not bring himself to write the novel. The novel would have been named "White Ferz" ("Белый Ферзь"). Ferz - the Russian term for Queen in chess, which has male gender in Russian. The novel would have followed the story of the infiltration of Maxim Kammerer, now a progressor, into the heart of the Island Empire.

The Island Empire would have been shown as consisting of several social "circles". While the outer circle represents a fascist militaristic society, the middle circle is a peaceful liberal society, and the inner core is a highly developed harmonic society of intellectuals, similar to the Noon Universe Earth. A special social apparatus directs each citizen of the Empire according to his personality to the circle where he belongs.

The book would have shown that this cruel social selection of the Island Empire is the more (or even the only) realistic way for a social utopia to exist, and by contrast would doubt if the Noon Universe's Earth is realistically possible, so much so that it is actually suggested to Maxim by one of the leaders of the Inner Circle (when he finally makes contact with them) that his "Earth" is really an imaginary world, some literary invention that is impossible to have existed in the real world (serving as the authors' final judgement upon their own creation).

Two other sequels exist, Beetle in the Anthill and The Time Wanderers, but their plots are almost independent from the first book: while they have the common characters, Maxim Kammerer and Rudolf Sikorski, the events of Inhabited Island are only briefly mentioned. The events that authors planned to describe in White Ferz took place at some time between the events of Beetle in the Anthill and The Time Wanderers.

Adaptations 
There have been three PC games based on the novel released in 2007: adventure game Inhabited Island: Earthling developed by Step Creative Group, strategy Galactic Assault developed by Wargaming and first-person shooter Inhabited Island: Prisoner of Power by Orion Games.

A two-part Russian movie adaptation, Dark Planet, was released in December 2008 and April 2009.

English editions 

The first English translation, by H.S. Jacobson, is based on the censored version of the novel, as the original version was unavailable to the translator.

The second English translation, by Andrew Bromfield, reflects the original version.

References

External links
 Read Prisoners of Power by Arkady and Boris Strugatsky on the Perm mirror of Maxim Moshkow Library.

1969 in the Soviet Union
1969 science fiction novels
Soviet science fiction novels
Noon Universe novels
Post-apocalyptic novels
Novels by Arkady and Boris Strugatsky
Macmillan Publishers books
Utopian novels
Russian novels adapted into films
Science fiction novels adapted into films